is a frequently-cited English contract law case which laid down that a contextual approach must be taken to the interpretation of contracts.

Lord Hoffmann set out five principles, so that contract should be construed according to:

what a reasonable person having all the background knowledge would have understood
where the background includes anything in the 'matrix of fact' that could affect the language's meaning
but excluding prior negotiations, for the policy of reducing litigation
where meaning of words is not to be deduced literally, but contextually
on the presumption that people do not easily make linguistic mistakes

Facts
Investors received negligent advice from their financial advisers, solicitors and building societies, including West Bromwich Building Society ('West Bromwich BS'). They had claims in tort and for breach of statutory duty. The investors had been encouraged by financiers to enter "Home Income Plans", which meant mortgaging their properties to get cash that they would put into equity linked bonds. They lost money when house prices and stocks fell. Under the Financial Services Act 1986 section 54 the Securities and Investments Board started the Investors Compensation Scheme Ltd, where investors could be directly compensated for their losses, and ICS would try recoup the cost by suing the building societies on everyone’s behalf. Accordingly, to get the compensation investors signed a contract to assign their claims to ICS. But in section 3(b) of the claim form the assignment excluded ‘Any claim (whether sounding in rescission for undue influence or otherwise) that you have or may have against the West Bromwich Building Society’, so that investors could still sue on some claims individually. While ICS Ltd was suing, West Bromwich BS argued that ‘or otherwise’ meant that claims for damages, as well as rescission, had not been assigned. ICS Ltd argued that the clause actually meant that claims for damages had been assigned, because ‘or otherwise’ referred to rescission based claims other than undue influence, but not damages.

Evan-Lombes J held that the right to claim rescission had been retained but the right to claim damages had been assigned. Leggatt LJ overturned the High Court, and ICS Ltd appealed.

Judgment
The House of Lords held by a majority that the right to claim rescission was retained by the investors, but the right to claim for damages had indeed been assigned. Construed in its context, the words ‘Any claim (whether sounding in rescission for undue influence or otherwise) that you have or may have against the West Bromwich Building Society’ in effect had meant 'Any claim sounding in rescission (whether for undue influence or otherwise)'. It followed that ICS Ltd could sue West Bromwich BS, and other building societies, to vindicate the investors' claims. Lord Lloyd dissented.

Lord Hoffmann stated the following.

Lord Goff, Lord Hope and Lord Clyde concurred.

See also

Rearden Smith Lines Ltd v Hansen Tangan [1976] 1 WLR 989
Principles of European Contract Law Article 5-102 (a) preliminary negotiations are relevant to interpretation and so is (g) good faith and fair dealing.
Hollier v Rambler Motors (AMC) Ltd [1972] 1 All ER 399
Gillespie Bros v Roy Bowles Ltd [1973] 1 QB 400, 415, Lord Denning, ‘judges have… time after time, sanctioned a departure from the ordinary meaning. They have done it under the guise of ‘construing’ the clause. They assume that the party cannot have intended anything so unreasonable. So they construe the clause ‘strictly’. They cut down the ordinary meaning of the words and reduce them to reasonable proportions. They use all their skill and art to that end.’
Rainy Sky SA v Kookmin Bank [2011] UKSC 50
Chartbrook Ltd v Persimmon Homes Ltd [2009] UKHL 38

Notes

References
G McMeel, ‘Prior Negotiations and Subsequent Conduct - the Next Step Forward for Contractual Interpretation’ (2003) 119 Law Quarterly Review 272, 296, says that ‘The best way forward is for the matter to be one of weight rather than admissibility.’ So declarations of subjective intent, prior negotiations and subsequent conduct should not be ruled out as irrelevant.
Lord Nicholls, ‘My Kingdom for a Horse: The Meaning of Words’ (2005) 121 LQR 577, argues that prior negotiations and subsequent conduct are already admissible for rectification (The Karen Oltman [1976] 2 Lloyd’s Rep 708) and the courts are well accustomed to determining what weight should be place on admissible evidence.
C Staughton [1999] Cambridge Law Journal 303

Further reading
Proforce Recruit Ltd v The Rugby Group Ltd [2008] EWCA Civ 69
Wallis, Son and Wells v Pratt and Haynes [1911] AC 394
Andrews Bros (Bournemouth) Ltd v Singer and Co Ltd [1934] 1 KB 17
Rutter v Palmer [1922] 2 KB 87
The Raphael [1982] 2 Lloyd’s Rep 42
Ailsa Craig Fishing Co Ltd v Malvern Fishing Co Ltd [1983] 1 WLR 964
, refused to differentiate.
Dorset CC v Southern Felt Roofing Ltd (1989) 48 Build LR 96
, 846
EE Caledonia Ltd v Orbit Valve Co Europe [1993] 4 All ER 165, 173, Hobhouse J
The Fiona [1994] 2 Lloyd’s Rep 506
Shell Chemicals UK Ltd v P&O Roadtanks Ltd [1995] 1 Lloyd’s Rep 297, 301.
Bank of Credit and Commerce International SA v Ali [2001] UKHL 8, Lord Hoffmann [60] (dissenting), the Canada Steamship doctrine ‘is a desperate remedy, to be invoked only if it is necessary to remedy a widespread injustice.’

English contract case law
English interpretation case law
House of Lords cases
1997 in case law
1997 in British law